Neil Delamere (born 1979) is an Irish comedian. He is a regular on the BBC Northern Ireland television show The Blame Game, and the reigning BBC Fighting Talk Champion of Champions.

Early life and education
Delamere is from Edenderry, County Offaly. He has a degree in Computer Applications from Dublin City University (DCU).

Career
He began his career in 2004 at the Edinburgh Festival. Since then he has worked for both Raidió Teilifís Éireann (RTÉ) and the BBC, in programmes such as the BBC comedy series One Night Stand, BBC radio and television panel quiz The Blame Game and RTÉ topical comedy show The Panel. He hosted Neil Delamere's Just For Laughs, a comedy television show in which he interviewed acts performing at the Montreal Festival. He featured on Michael McIntyre's Comedy Roadshow on 4 July 2009. Delamere made his debut appearance on Radio Five Live's panel show Fighting Talk, broadcast on 11 December 2010, and won.

In 2011, he hosted The Only Viking in the Village on RTÉ, in which he explored his Viking roots. The show was nominated in the factual category for an Irish Film and Television Award, and won. He has also acted as a stand-in for John Murray on RTÉ Radio 1.

He presented the comedy documentary There's Something about Patrick which aired on 14 March 2013 on RTÉ 1.

Delamere also works for Today FM, where he presents his own show titled "Neil Delamere's Sunday Best" which airs on Sundays.

Selected television credits
 The Panel (RTÉ Two/One)
 Neil Delamere's Just For Laughs (RTÉ Two)
 The Blame Game (BBC)
 The World Stands Up (Paramount)
 Republic of Telly (RTÉ Two)
 Michael McIntyre's Comedy Roadshow (BBC One)
 There's Something about Patrick (RTÉ One) - 2013
 Holding out for a Hero (RTÉ Two) - 2014
 Ireland's Fittest Family, Celebrity Special (RTÉ One) - 2021
Dancing With the Stars, fifth Irish series (2022)

References

External links
Official Site

1979 births
Living people
Alumni of Dublin City University
Irish male comedians
Irish stand-up comedians
Irish people of French descent
People from Edenderry, County Offaly
RTÉ television presenters
The Panel (Irish TV series) presenters